Iñaki Lejarreta Errasti (1 September 1983 – 16 December 2012) was a Spanish mountain biker. He was a junior world champion in 2001, and national mountain bike champion in 2007. He competed in the cross-country cycling at the 2008 Beijing Olympics, and was professionally part of the Orbea cycling team. In 2012, Lejarreta was killed in a crash while training when his cycle was struck by a car. He was 29.

His father Ismael and his uncle Marino (winner of the 1982 Vuelta a España) were also professional cyclists.

Track Record (only top 20)
2012
 20th World Championship – Saalfelden, Austria
 3rd Spanish Championship – Lorca, Murcia
 1st C.C.International – Val de Lord, Lleida
 2nd C.C.Internacional – Banyoles, Lleida
 4th French Cup – St.Raphael, France
 4th Portugal Cup – Diverlanhoso, Portugal
 5th French Cup – Meribel, France
 6th French Cup – Super Besse, France
 6th Belgacom – Stoumont, Belgium
 14th Bundesliga – Albstadt, Germany
 17th World Cup – Pietermaritzburg, South Africa
 1st road race - Lazkao, Gipuzkoa

2011
 7th World Cup – Pietermaritzburg, South Africa
 14th World Championship – Champery, Switzerland
 2nd Spanish Championship – Becerril de la Sierra, Madrid
 12th World Cup – Offenburg, Germany
 1st C.C.International – Val de Lord, Lleida
 1st Portugal Cup – Seia, Portugal
 1st Andalucia Bike Race 3th stage – Cordoba, Cordoba
 2nd Andalucia Bike Race 1st stage – Cordoba, Cordoba
 2nd Andalucia Bike Race 2nd stage – Cordoba, Cordoba
 4th French Cup – St.Raphael, France
 4th Spanish Cup – Madrid, Madrid
 1st in 10 races

2010
 8th European Championship – Haifa, Israel
 1st Overall Spanish Cup (MTB)
 1st Spanish Cup – Huelva, Huelva
 1st Spanish Cup – Aviles, Asturias
 1st Spanish Cup – Cueva del Soplao, Cantabria
 10th World Cup – Offenburg, Germany
 31st World Championship – Mont Sainte Anne, Canada
 2nd Bundesliga – Münsingen, Germany
 2nd Spanish Cup– Banyoles, Girona
 2nd Spanish Cup – Val de Lord, Lleida
 2nd Spanish Cup – Port Aine, Lleida
 4th Spanish Championship – Montjuic, Barcelona
 9th Bundesliga – Heubach, Germany
 16th World Cup – Windham, USA
 18th World Cup – Dalby Forest, United Kingdom

2009
 8th World Cup – Madrid, Spain
 1st Spanish Cup – Berriz, Bizkaia
 20th World Championship – Canberra, Australia
 3rd Spanish Cup – Aviles, Asturias
 4th Spanish Championship – Montjuic, Barcelona
 4th Switzerland Cup – Winterthur, Switzerland
 14th World Cup – Schladming, Austria
 17th World Cup – Offenburg, Germany
 18th European Championship – Zoetermeer, Netherlands

2008
 8th Olympic Games – Beijing, China
 8th World Championship – Comezzadura, Italy
 9th World Cup – Vallnord, Andorra
 3rd French Cup – St.Raphael, France
 4th Spanish Championship – Port Aine, Lleida
 4th Spanish Cup – Aviles, Asturias
 15th World Cup – Offenburg, Germany
 17th World Cup – Houffalize, Belgium

2007
 10th World Cup – Houffalize, Belgium
 1st Spanish Cup – Ager, Lleida
 1st second stage in Tour of Catalonia - Calaf, Lleida
 2nd French Cup – Montgenevre, France
 3rd Spanish Championship – Ramales, Cantabria
 3rd French Cup – St. Flour, France
 5th Switzerland Cup – Schaan, Switzerland
 6th Switzerland Cup – Hasliberg, Switzerland
 15th World Cup – Monta Sainte Anne, Canada
 15th World Cup – Maribor, Slovenia
 18th World Cup – Champery, Switzerland

2006
 6th Roc d’Azur Classic – Frejus, France
 1st Catalonia Internacional Championship - Calaf

2005
 1st U23 Basque Country Championship (Road)
 2nd U23 Spanish Championship - Vilaboa
 1st U23 Basque Country Championship (Road)

2004
 3rd World Cup (1st U23) – Livigno, Italy
 4th U23 World Championship – Les Gets, France
 2nd U23 European Championship – Wallbryzch, Poland
 10th World Cup Overall (2nd U23)
 3rd Team Relay European Championship – Wallbryzch, Poland
 14th World Cup (1st U23) – Schladming, Austria
 1st Spanish Cup – Candeleda

2003
 1st Overall Spanish Cup
 1st in 4 stages of Spanish Cup

2002
 3rd U23 European Championship – Zurich, Switzerland
 2nd U23 Spanish Championship – San Isidro

2001
 1st Junior World Championship – Vail, Colorado U.S.A
 3rd Team Relay World Championship – Vail, Colorado U.S.A
 9th Junior Time Trial World Championship – Lisboa, Portugal (Road)
 1st Junior Spanish Championship - Vigo
 1st Overall Junior Spanish Cup
 1st all stages of Junior Spanish Cup
 1st Olympic pursuit Spanish Championship - Logroño (Track)
 3rd Individual pursuit Spanish Championship - Logroño (Track)
 1st in three stages of Basque Country Cup (Road)
 1st Main stage of Vuelta Pamplona (Road)
 1st Time Trial of Vuelta Pamplona (Road)
 3rd Overall Vuelta Pamplona (Road)
 1st Time Trial race in France (Road)
 1st Time Trial Bizkaia Championship (Road)
 1st Time Trial Junior Grand Prix des Nations – St.Romain, France (Road)

2000
 1st Team Relay World Championship – Sierra Nevada, Spain
 2nd Junior World Championship – Sierra Nevada, Spain
 8th Junior European Championship – Rennen, Netherlands
 2nd Junior Spanish Championship - Candanchú
 1st Junior Spanish Cup - Girona
 1st in two stages of Basque Country Cup (Road)
 3rd Overall Vuelta La Rioja (Road)

1999
 1st Spanish Championship – Sierra Nevada, Spain
 1st in four stages of Basque Country Cup (Road)

References

External links
Official website

1983 births
2012 deaths
Cyclists at the 2008 Summer Olympics
Cross-country mountain bikers
Olympic cyclists of Spain
Road incident deaths in Spain
Sportspeople from Biscay
Spanish male cyclists
People from Durangaldea
Cyclists from the Basque Country (autonomous community)